James Edward Zimmerman (February 19, 1923 – August 4, 1999) was born in Lantry, South Dakota. He was a coinventor of the radio-frequency superconducting quantum interference device (SQUID) and he is credited with coining the term.

Career 
 Westinghouse Research Laboratory, Pittsburgh Pennsylvania - 1943 – ??
 Smithsonian Institution, 1953 – 1955
 Ford Motor Company, Scientific Laboratory in Dearborn, Michigan, 1955 – 1969
 SHE (later BTi, then 4-D Neuroimaging), Founder 1969 – 1970
 National Bureau of Standards, 1970 – 1985

While at NIST, Zimmerman introduced two important innovations in SQUID magnetometry:
 Fractional-turn SQUID, improving the coupling efficiency
 SQUID gradiometer, improving sensitivity to nearby fields

In addition, in the late 1970s and early 1980s, he also gave a major contribution to the development of low-power closed-cycle Stirling refrigerators, to reach temperatures in the range 4K - 8K with the purpose of cooling SQUID devices and small-scale superconducting electronics without resorting to liquid helium dewar vessels.
A major achievement was the use of plastic parts made in the laboratory, which would be assembled in a totally non-magnetic cryocooler (refrigerator), in order not to interfere with highly sensitive SQUIDs..
Later, he was also involved in the development of pulse tube cryocoolers.

Education 
South Dakota School of Mines and Technology, B.S. Electrical Engineering 1943 
Carnegie Institute of Technology, ScD Physics 1951 – 1953

Awards 
NIST Fellow
Samuel Wesley Stratton Award, the highest award for scientific achievement conferred by NIST
In 1987 he became one of the first to make a SQUID using the newly discovered high-temperature superconductors.

Trivia 
On New Year's Eve of 1969, he participated in an historic experiment, conducted at MIT in collaboration with David Cohen and Edgar Edelsak recording the first human magnetocardiogram using a SQUID sensor.

20th-century American engineers
1923 births
1999 deaths
People from Dewey County, South Dakota